General Mervyn Archdall (27 April 1763 – 26 July 1839) was an Irish officer in the British Army and Member of Parliament for County Fermanagh in the Parliament of the United Kingdom.

He was the eldest son of Mervyn Archdall (1724?–1813) of Castle Archdall, Enniskillen, Fermanagh, an MP in the Parliament of Ireland for nearly 40 years. He succeeded his father in 1813, inheriting Castle Archdale house.

Archdall joined the British Army as an ensign in the 12th Dragoons and rose through the ranks in that regiment to that of full general on 27 May 1825. He had command of the regiment under Sir Ralph Abercromby during the Egyptian campaign, losing his right arm in an impromptu cavalry charge at Lake Mareotis in 1801. As a major-general he afterwards spent time on the staff in Ireland.

In 1833, he and wife Jane were passengers in a carriage accident cause by flooding near Castle Saunderson in Cavan.

He was MP for County Fermanagh in the Parliament of the UK from 1802 to 1834 following his father, who had been a co-opted member in 1801.

He was appointed Lieutenant-Governor of the Isle of Wight for life in 1815. He was also Governor of County Fermanagh (1813–1831), Grand Master of the Orange Order (1818–1822) and a Trustee of the Irish Linen Board.

He had married Jane, the daughter of Gustavus Hume Rochfort, MP and had one son & daughter (both illegitimate). His estate passed to his brother Colonel William Archdall (1768-1857) and thereafter to his nephew Edward Mervyn Archdale, MP. He died in 1839.

References

1763 births
1839 deaths
People from County Fermanagh
British Army generals
Members of the Parliament of the United Kingdom for County Fermanagh constituencies (1801–1922)
UK MPs 1802–1806
UK MPs 1806–1807
UK MPs 1807–1812
UK MPs 1812–1818
UK MPs 1818–1820
UK MPs 1820–1826
UK MPs 1826–1830
UK MPs 1830–1831
UK MPs 1831–1832
UK MPs 1832–1835
12th Royal Lancers officers
British Army personnel of the Napoleonic Wars
Grand Masters of the Orange Order
British amputees